Tootsa MacGinty is a clothing company that makes unisex clothes for children between the ages of 0 to 8.

History
The company was started by womenswear designer Kate Pietrasik in 2011. It is one of the first to bring unisex kidswear to the market in the UK. In 2013 the company introduced its first adult item, in response to enquiries.

Pietrasik had previously worked designing streetwear and sportswear for brands including Hilfiger and Roxy. The company currently consists of Pietrasik, her two parents, and a PR and Brand Manager. She says she was inspired to create unisex children's clothing after being shocked by the gender segregated children's clothing available in the UK High Street, after having lived in France for 10 years where the situation was less pronounced. Tootsa MacGinty manufactures its clothes in Portugal. Beyond using social media, trade fairs and word-of-mouth marketing, the company doesn't advertise.

The company has collaborated with UK environmental campaign group, Surfers Against Sewage, to produce a series of fundraising T-shirts.

In 2021, Tootsa was purchased by Inc Retail, which is part of Inc & Co.

References

External links
Official Website

Clothing companies of the United Kingdom
British companies established in 2011
Infants' clothing
Children's clothing designers
Children's clothing brands
Clothing companies established in 2011
2011 establishments in England